Fortaleza de Nossa Senhora da Assunção is a fort located in Fortaleza, Ceará in Brazil.

See also
Military history of Brazil

References

External links

Nossa Senhora
Buildings and structures in Fortaleza
Portuguese colonial architecture in Brazil